"Você Existe Em Mim" (English: You Exist in Me) is singer-songwriter Josh Groban's second single for his fifth studio album Illuminations.

Background
This is Groban's interpretation of a Portuguese song written by lyricist Lester Mendez and Brazilian arranger Carlinhos Brown. Groban had worked with Mendez before when duetting on "Silencio" from Nelly Furtado's 2009 Spanish-language album Mi Plan. The song also features an all-girl drum corp Banda Dida. It is Groban's first time singing in Portuguese.

Cover versions
 In 2012, the song was performed by Brazilian pop singer Claudia Leitte and is featured on her second live album, Negalora: Íntimo.
 In 2013, Sam Alves performed the song during the semifinals of the second season of The Voice Brasil. His cover version hit No. 1 on the Brazil iTunes charts.

Track listing and formats
 Digital download
 "Você Existe Em Mim" – 5:05

Personnel
Vocals – Josh Groban
Drums – Banda Dida
Writers – Josh Groban, Lester Mendez, Carlinhos Brown

Release history

References

External links
Official website

2010 songs
Josh Groban songs
Songs written by Josh Groban
Songs written by Lester Mendez
2010 singles
Reprise Records singles
Songs written by Carlinhos Brown